Unashamed was a Christian hardcore punk band that became one of the founding bands in the Spirit-Filled HardCore movement. Their bold faith-based lyrics center around ideas directly lifted from the Bible and conservative morality. They released two albums on Tooth & Nail Records. After signing with Tooth & Nail, the band toured until their "final" show at Cornerstone Festival in 1998. In 2009, the band announced that they were reforming with many of their original line-up, and would begin touring hard into 2010.

Members
Last known lineup
 Jeff Jacquay – vocals (1993–1996, 2009–2011)
 Bobby Canaday – guitar (1993–1998, 2009–2011)
 Dom Macaluso – bass guitar (2009–2011)
 Matt Mentley – guitar (2009–2011)
 Randy Baranosky – drums (2009–2011)

Former members
 Dave Bhanson – vocals (1993)
 Dave Lauridsen – vocals (1993)
 Dan "Danno" McManigal – guitar (1993–1998)
 Chris  Bertoni – drums (1993–1995) 
 Shane Sowers – bass guitar (1993–1995)
 Jason Carson – drums (1995–1998)
 Matt Hernandez – bass guitar (1995–1998)

Timeline

Discography
'Studio albums
 Silence (1994)
 Reflection (1996)

Compilation appearances
 Helpless Amongst Friends Vol. 1 (1995)

References

External links
 Jension, David (1995) . HM Magazine. Retrieved on May 25, 2016.

Metalcore musical groups from California
Christian rock groups from California
Christian hardcore musical groups
Hardcore punk groups from California
Musical groups from Orange County, California
Tooth & Nail Records artists